Treverbyn Vean is a 19th-century mansion in St Neot, Cornwall. Its exterior was designed by George Gilbert Scott and its interior by William Burges, two of the major architects of the Gothic Revival. The house is a Grade II* listed building. It remains a private home, although various outbuildings may be rented.

History and architecture 
Commissioned by Colonel Charles Cocks, the house was constructed between 1858 and 1862. The house has an exterior designed by George Gilbert Scott and an interior by William Burges. It is a Grade II* listed building as at 5 November 1987. Externally, the house forms an "irregular range in Tudor Gothic Revival style." Internally, "the house retains more of its original interior than any other by Burges, apart from those for Lord Bute at Cardiff Castle and Castle Coch and Sir John Heathcote Amory at Knightshayes in Devon". In his interiors Burges attempted to "...conjure up, in Victorian terms, the artistic spirit of a medieval house. Many contemporaries regarded these attempts as the pinnacle of Burges's success". Treverbyn Vean is listed "for the importance of these surviving interior features as well as its fine exterior composition by Scott". Burges's contribution to the house is overlooked in the 2013 revised edition of the Cornwall Pevsner. Treverbyn Vean remains a private home, although ancillary buildings, including the lodge, are available to rent.

References

Sources

External links
 Entry on Treverbyn Vean at GilbertScott.org

 

Country houses in Cornwall
Gothic Revival architecture in Cornwall
Grade II* listed buildings in Cornwall
Grade II* listed houses
George Gilbert Scott buildings
National Heritage List for England
Buildings and structures in Cornwall
William Burges buildings